The 2023 Junior Africa Cup will be an international field hockey competition held from 12 to 16 March 2023 in Ismailia, Egypt.

The tournament serves as a direct qualifier for the 2023 Junior World Cup, with the winner and runner-up qualifying.

The South Africa won a record seven title by defeating Zimbabwe 1–0 in the final.

Qualified teams
The following teams have qualified for the tournament.

Results

Pool Stage

Matches

Final round

Third and fourth place

Final

Awards
The following awards were given at the conclusion of the tournament.

Final standings

Goalscorers

See also
2023 Men's Hockey Junior Africa Cup

References

Hockey Junior Africa Cup
Junior Africa cup
Africa cup
Junior Africa cup
Sport in Cairo
International sports competitions hosted by Egypt
21st century in Cairo
Junior Africa cup
Africa Cup